The , often shortened to the Bloc populaire or the Bloc, was a political party in the Canadian province of Quebec from 1942 to 1947. It was founded on September 8, 1942 by opponents of conscription during the Second World War. The party ran candidates at both federal and provincial levels.

Origin
In early 1942, Liguori Lacombe formed the anti-conscriptionist Parti canadien which finished strongly in two February by-elections.

In the April 27, 1942 national plebiscite on conscription held in Canada, a little more than 70% of Quebec voters refused to free the federal government from its promise to avoid a general mobilization, while about 80 per cent of the citizens of the rest of Canada accepted it. (see also Second Conscription Crisis)

The party was inspired by the nationalist ideas of Henri Bourassa and supported by Montreal mayor Camillien Houde. Jean Drapeau and Pierre Elliot Trudeau were members in their youth.

In addition to opposing conscription, the party aimed to defend provincial autonomy and the rights of French-Canadians.

Provincial level

At the provincial level, it was led by André Laurendeau and won four seats in the 1944 Quebec general election, but soon lost popularity. Laurendeau resigned in July 1947, and the party dissolved and did not participate in the 1948 general election.

Federal level

At the federal level it was led by Maxime Raymond, who had been Member of Parliament (MP) from the province of Quebec since the 1925 federal election. He and two of his Liberal colleagues (Édouard Lacroix and Pierre Gauthier) crossed the floor to sit as Bloc populaire canadien MPs.

The Bloc populaire won a federal by-election in 1943.

The Bloc populaire's entry into provincial politics antagonized Quebec Premier Maurice Duplessis, leader of the Union Nationale, who henceforth transferred his party's federal support to the "Independent Group" of anti-conscription MPs led by Frédéric Dorion in the 1945 federal election.

In the 1945 federal election, the Bloc nominated 35 candidates. All of them except two ran in Quebec-based ridings. (Lionel Campeau, ran in the district of Nipissing in Northern Ontario and Léandre Maisonneuve ran in the Eastern Ontario riding of Prescott. Only two candidates were elected as Members of Parliament: Maxime Raymond and René Hamel. Though former Montreal mayor Camillien Houde was officially listed as an independent candidate, he was reported to be the Bloc populaire's co-leader in the 1945 election.

In addition to the Bloc populaire, there was also an "Independent Group" of five anti-conscription MPs led by Frédéric Dorion which included Liguori Lacombe, Wilfrid Lacroix, Sasseville Roy and Emmanuel D'Anjou (D'Anjou had joined the Bloc in June 1944 but had left to join Dorion's group by the time of the 1945 election). Additionally, Arthur Cardin quit Mackenzie King's cabinet in May 1942 over the conscription issue to sit as an anti-conscription independent MP.

Decline

The Second World War ended in 1945, and by the late 1940s the party's concerns had largely become a non-issue. Many insiders abandoned the party. The Bloc populaire canadien contested neither the 1948 provincial election nor the 1949 federal election, and soon ceased to exist.

Publications
The party published a modest and short-lived weekly newspaper, Le Bloc, in 1944 and 1945, with a circulation of about 15,000 copies. The newspaper was under the responsibility of Victor Trépanier in early 1944 and of Léopold Richer in 1944–1945. The party also published a series of ten brochures reproducing the texts of radio speeches by its leaders.

Quebec provincial election results

Members of the Legislative Assembly of Quebec

Members of the Canadian House of Commons

Notable defeated candidate

Prominent insider

Notes

References

See also
 Conscription Crisis of 1944 
 Politics of Quebec
 List of Quebec general elections
 National Assembly of Quebec
 Timeline of Quebec history

External links
  Platform of the Bloc populaire (1944)
 National Assembly historical information
 La Politique québécoise sur le Web

Federal political parties in Canada
Political parties established in 1942
Defunct political parties in Canada
Political parties disestablished in 1947
Opposition to World War II
Nationalist parties in Canada
1942 establishments in Quebec
1947 disestablishments in Quebec
Defunct provincial political parties in Quebec